X70 may refer to:

Automobiles
 Jetour X70, a 2018–present Chinese mid-size SUV
 Lifan X70, a 2018–present Chinese compact SUV
 Oshan X70A, a 2017–present Chinese compact SUV
 Proton X70, a 2019–present Malaysian compact SUV
 Toyota Chaser (X70), a 1984–1988 Japanese mid-size sedan
 Toyota Cresta (X70), a 1984–1988 Japanese mid-size sedan
 Toyota Mark II (X70), a 1984–1988 Japanese mid-size car

Electronics
 Canon EOS Kiss X70, a digital single-lens reflex camera
 Fujifilm X70, a digital compact camera
 Toshiba Qosmio X70 series, a laptop
 Viliv X70, a ultra-mobile PC

See also
 X7 (disambiguation)